So Dark the Night is a 1946 American crime film with film noir influences, featuring Steven Geray, Micheline Cheirel, and Eugene Borden. Based on a story written by Aubrey Wisberg, the screenplay was written by Dwight V. Babcock and Martin Berkeley, and directed by Joseph H. Lewis.

Plot
A Parisian detective, Henri Cassin (Steven Geray), falls in love with country innkeeper Pierre Michaud's daughter Nanette (Micheline Cheirel) while on a long overdue vacation. She is a simple girl with a jealous boyfriend, Leon (Paul Marion). Nonetheless, the detective becomes engaged to her. On the night of her engagement party the girl vanishes and later turns up dead. Cassin believes that the obvious suspect is Leon, but soon he is also found killed. Soon after Nanette's mother (Ann Codee) receives a warning that she will be the next to die, then is found strangled.

Pierre, fearing for his safety, decides to sell the inn. Henri returns to Paris, and using his investigative skill produces a rendering of the killer.

To Henri's astonishment, the sketch is of himself.  When he fits his shoe into the footprint, he realizes he is the murderer. After making a full confession to the police commissioner, Henri is evaluated by a psychiatrist, who determines that he is schizophrenic. Though placed under watch of a guard, Henri escapes back to St. Margot, where he tries to strangle Pierre. The police commissioner, who has followed the detective to the village, catches him in the act and shoots him dead.

Cast
 Steven Geray as Henri Cassin
 Micheline Cheirel as Nanette Michaud
 Eugene Borden as Pierre Michaud
 Ann Codee as Mama Michaud
 Egon Brecher as Dr. Boncourt
 Helen Freeman as Widow Bridelle

Critical reception
At the time of its release the staff at Variety magazine gave the film a positive review, writing, "Around the frail structure of a story [by Aubrey Wisberg] about a schizophrenic Paris police inspector who becomes an insane killer at night, a tight combination of direction, camerawork and musical scoring produce a series of isolated visual effects that are subtle and moving to an unusual degree."

In 2003 the critic Dennis Schwartz lauded the film, writing:

The modern critic Karl Williams called the film, "[A] well-plotted and executed film noir [which] suffered from its lack of star power, but has become something of a cult classic."

The film was released on Blu-ray in 2019 by Arrow Films in the UK and Eire.

References

External links
 
 
 
 
 

1946 films
1946 crime films
1946 mystery films
1940s psychological thriller films
American black-and-white films
American mystery films
Columbia Pictures films
1940s English-language films
Film noir
Films directed by Joseph H. Lewis
Films scored by Hugo Friedhofer
American police detective films
Films with screenplays by Aubrey Wisberg
1940s American films